Mallam Garba Shehu born on (November 27, 1959) is a Nigerian Journalist and politician who serves as the Senior Special Assistant, Media and Publicity to the President of the Federal Republic of Nigeria, Muhammadu Buhari. He was the president of Nigerian Guild of Editors and spokesperson of the former vice president of Nigeria, Atiku Abubakar.

Background 
Shehu was born on December 12, 1962, in Dutse, Jigawa State where he grew up with his parents.

Education 
Shehu attended Dutse primary school in 1970. He furthered his education at Barewa College, Zaria in 1975. In 1981, he obtained a bachelor's degree from Bayero University, Kano.

Career 
Shehu started his career as a correspondent at Nigerian Television Authority, Sokoto in 1982. He was then an energy correspondent at Network News Lagos in 1984. He became the managing director (MD) of the Triumph at the age of thirty-three (33) and the President of the Guild of Editors at the age of thirty-seven (37).

The former Vice President of Nigeria, Alhaji Atiku Abubakar, appointed him as Special Assistant on Media in 2003. Shehu was relieved six (6) months later by the former president, Olusegun Obasanjo who was empowered by the constitution to appoint nd relieve political aides for the Vice President. He continued working at the Atiku Media Office (AMO), the media organ of the then Vice President's political movement, after his sack.

In 2015, he was appointed the director of Media and Publicity of the All Progressive Congress (APC) for the presidential campaign council. In 2015, he was appointed as Senior Special Assistant, Media and Publicity by the president of the Federal Republic of Nigeria, Muhammadu Buhari and was reappointed after the President was sworn in for another term of four (4) years. He currently writes as a columnist in the Nigerian Premium Times.

Controversy 
In November 2020, Boko Haram members killed 66 people, mostly farmers and fishermen at Koshobe village near Zabarmari, Jere Local Government Area of Borno State. Garba Shehu was criticized after his interview with BBC where he said the victims didn't get military clearance to farm.

In December 2020, about 333 students were abducted in the town of Kankara, in Katsina state. Garba Shehu came under heavy criticism when he said only 10 students were abducted contrary to the state government and media claims. He would later apologize for misleading the public.

On December 23, 2020, a former presidential spokesperson, Reno Omokri, challenged Garba Shehu, after his claim that President Muhammadu Buhari has made Nigeria safer that it was, to spend a night without security in Koshobe, or Kware, verified by an independent journalist. Reno promised a reward of $20,000.

Garba Shehu in his response said; "If this is the money from the collections made in the name of Leah Sharibu, the unfortunate Christian girl stolen by Boko Haram, I won’t touch it with a long. Please keep “your USD20000"". He was criticized by Nigerians who believe his description of Leah Sharibu as "unfortunate Christian girl" is insensitive.

References

External links 
 https://statehouse.gov.ng/

Nigerian politicians
Living people
Nigerian columnists
Place of birth missing (living people)
Nigerian government officials
1962 births